Salvador Garriga Polledo (born 6 August 1957, in Gijon)
is a Spanish politician and
Member of the European Parliament with the People's Party (PP),
part of the European People's Party and sits on
the European Parliament's Committee on Budgets.

He is a substitute for the Committee on Budgetary Control
and the Committee on Economic and Monetary Affairs. Garriga joined the Spanish Congress of deputies as a substitute member in 1990 for Madrid serving until 1993.

Education
 1982: Economist
 1983: Diploma in foreign trade

Career
 1981-1994: Businessman specialising in external trade
 1982-1987: Responsible for external relations of Nuevas Generaciones del PP (PP youth section)
 1984-1989: Economic adviser
 1987-1989 and since 1994: Member of the European Parliament
 1987-1989: Deputy Chairman of the DEMYC (Democrat Youth Community of Europe)
 1987-1993: Secretary for Sectoral Relations in the PP

See also
 2004 European Parliament election in Spain

External links
 
 

1957 births
Politicians from Asturias
Living people
Members of the 4th Congress of Deputies (Spain)
MEPs for Spain 1987–1989
MEPs for Spain 1999–2004
MEPs for Spain 2004–2009
MEPs for Spain 2009–2014
People's Party (Spain) MEPs
People from Gijón